Terellia palposa is a species of tephritid or fruit flies in the genus Terellia of the family Tephritidae.

Distribution
Canada, United States.

References

Tephritinae
Insects described in 1862
Diptera of North America